The 2008 United States presidential election in Kentucky took place on November 4, 2008, and was part of the 2008 United States presidential election. Voters chose eight representatives, or electors to the Electoral College, who voted for president and vice president.

Kentucky was won by Republican nominee John McCain by a 16.23% margin of victory. Prior to the election, all 17 news organizations considered this a state McCain would win, or otherwise a red state. In the primaries, Hillary Clinton slightly defeated McCain in hypothetical polls for the Bluegrass State. Once Barack Obama secured the Democratic nomination, Kentucky was reclassified as safe for the GOP. In the end, Kentucky voted for McCain with 57.40% of the vote. Obama did, however, improve on John Kerry's performance by two points. This was the first time since 1960 where Kentucky did not vote for the winning candidate in a presidential election. Additionally, this was only the second presidential election (after 1960) since the founding of the Republican Party that a Democrat was elected president without carrying the state. This was the first time ever in which Kentucky voted more Republican than neighboring Indiana. This was also the first time ever that Floyd and Knott Counties voted for the Republican candidate, as well as the first time since 1908 that Breathitt County voted for the Republican candidate. As such, Obama became the first Democrat to ever win the presidency without carrying any of Breathitt, Floyd, Knott, Ballard, Bath, or Fulton Counties. 

As of 2020, this remains the last time that a Democratic presidential nominee has won over 40% of the vote in Kentucky.

Primaries
2008 Kentucky Democratic primary
2008 Kentucky Republican primary

Campaign

Predictions
There were 16 news organizations who made state-by-state predictions of the election. Here are their last predictions before election day:

Polling

McCain won every pre-election poll, almost all of them by a double-digit margin and with at least 49% of the vote. The final 3 polls averaged McCain leading 56% to 41%.

Fundraising
John McCain raised a total of $1,220,017. Barack Obama raised $2,394,198.

Advertising and visits
Obama spent $183,738 while a conservative interest groups spent just $212. Each ticket visited the state once.

Analysis
  
Since 1964, Kentucky has only gone Democratic three times--Jimmy Carter in 1976 and Bill Clinton in 1992 and 1996, both of whom were White Anglo Saxon Protestants (WASPs) from the South, whereas Obama was an African American "big-city liberal" from Chicago. (Similar socio-cultural dynamics existed in other Southern and Appalachian states with a large ancestral Democratic base, such as Tennessee, West Virginia, and Arkansas.)

In the 2008 primary, exits polls conducted found that 30 percent of Clinton supporters opted not to vote for Obama in the general election, 40% would vote McCain and the rest would support Obama in the general election. Several counties in the southeastern part of the state swung Republican and went to McCain as solidly Democratic Floyd and Knott counties voted Republican for the first time ever, and Breathitt County voted Republican for the first time since 1908. Obama decided to not spend campaign funds on Kentucky and instead went to more viable battleground states like North Carolina and Indiana instead. McCain won Kentucky by a margin of 16.22 points on election day and performed slightly worse than George Bush in 2004. Obama improved upon Kerry's performance in big cities and urban areas while McCain improved upon Bush in rural areas. Kentucky was the first state called for either candidate. This was the first time since 1952 that Kentucky voted for a different presidential candidate than neighboring Ohio, as well as the first time ever that Kentucky voted Republican while Ohio voted Democratic.

At the same time, incumbent Republican U.S. Senator Mitch McConnell, who also served as Senate Minority Leader at the time, was just narrowly reelected with 52.97% of the vote to Democrat Bruce Lunsford's 47.03%. Republicans also held onto an open seat vacated by Ron Lewis in Kentucky's 2nd Congressional District. At the state level, however, Democrats picked up two seats in the Kentucky House of Representatives.

, this is the last election in which Rowan County, Hancock County, Menifee County, Wolfe County, and Henderson County voted for the Democratic candidate.

Results

By county

Counties that flipped from Republican to Democratic 
 Fayette (largest municipality: Lexington)
 Hancock (largest municipality: Hawesville)
 Henderson (largest municipality: Henderson)

Counties that flipped from Democratic to Republican 
 Bath (largest municipality: Owingsville)
 Breathitt (largest municipality: Jackson)
 Carter (largest municipality: Grayson)
 Floyd (largest municipality: Prestonburg)
 Knott (largest municipality: Hindman)
 Magoffin (largest municipality: Salyersville)
 Pike (largest municipality: Pikeville)

By congressional district
John McCain carried 5 of the state's 6 congressional districts, including one of the two districts held by a Democrat.

Electors

Technically the voters of Kentucky cast their ballots for electors: representatives to the Electoral College. Kentucky is allocated 8 electors because it has 6 congressional districts and 2 senators. All candidates who appear on the ballot or qualify to receive write-in votes must submit a list of 8 electors, who pledge to vote for their candidate and his or her running mate. Whoever wins the majority of votes in the state is awarded all 8 electoral votes. Their chosen electors then vote for president and vice president. Although electors are pledged to their candidate and running mate, they are not obligated to vote for them. An elector who votes for someone other than his or her candidate is known as a faithless elector.

The electors of each state and the District of Columbia met on December 15, 2008, to cast their votes for president and vice president. The Electoral College itself never meets as one body. Instead the electors from each state and the District of Columbia met in their respective capitols.

The following were the members of the Electoral College from the state. All 8 were pledged to John McCain and Sarah Palin:
James Henry Snider
Walter A. Baker
Edna M. Fulkerson
Amy B. Towles
Nancy Mitchell
Don Ball
Robert Gable
Elizabeth G. Thomas

References

Kentucky
2008
United States presidential